The 2018–19 Ismaily season was the 96th season in the football club's history and 48th consecutive and 56th overall season in the top flight of Egyptian football, the Egyptian Premier League, having been promoted from the Egyptian Second Division in 1962. In addition to the domestic league, Ismaily also competed in this season's editions of the domestic cup, the Egypt Cup, the first-tier African cup, the CAF Champions League, and the first-tier Arab cup, the Arab Club Champions Cup. The season covered a period from 1 July 2018 to 30 June 2019; however Ismaily played their last match of the season in July 2019.

Kit information
Supplier: Adidas

Players

Current squad

Out on loan

Transfers

Transfers in

Loans in

Transfers out

Loans out

Friendly matches

Salalah Friendly Tournament

Competitions

Overview

Egyptian Premier League

League table

Results summary

Results by round

Matches

Egypt Cup

CAF Champions League

Premilinary round

First round

Group C

Arab Club Champions Cup

First round

Second round

Statistics

Appearances and goals

! colspan="13" style="background:#DCDCDC; text-align:center" | Players transferred out during the season
|-

|}

Goalscorers

Clean sheets

References

Notes

Ismaily